Middlebrook is a rural locality in the Tablelands Region, Queensland, Australia.

History 
Middlebrook Road State School opened on 2 September 1935 with Charles Mathew Connolly as the first head teacher. It closed circa 14 December 1945. The school building was relocated to Millaa Millaa State School and a bus service was provided to transport the students to Millaa Millaa to attend school each day.

References 

Tablelands Region
Localities in Queensland